Domenico Quaglio is the name of:
 Domenico Quaglio the Elder (1723–1760), Italian painter
 Domenico Quaglio the Younger (1787–1837), Italian painter, son of Giuseppe Quaglio

See also
 Quaglio